Archibald Wright (November 29, 1809 – September 13, 1884) was a Tennessee lawyer who served as a justice of the Tennessee Supreme Court from 1858 to 1885.

Early life, education, military service, and career
Born in Maury County, Tennessee, to very poor parents of Scottish ancestry, shortly after his birth his family moved to the adjoining Giles County. He attended Mount Pleasant Academy and Giles College, where he studied diligently, and then sought out Judge Bramblette in Pulaski to study law. Bramblette was initially skeptical, but accepted Wright as a student, and Wright gained admission to the bar in 1832, opening a law office in Pulaski, Tennessee.

Wright enlisted to fight in the Second Seminole War, and served for the duration of the war, thereafter returning to practice law in Pulaski. He was elected to represent Giles County in the Tennessee State Legislature in 1847, remaining in Pulaski until 1851, when his growing success in legal practice prompted him to move to Memphis, Tennessee. There, he formed a partnership with Thomas J. Turley.

Judicial service and later life
Although Wright reportedly "did not solicit the position", on June 19, 1858, Governor Isham G. Harris appointed Wright to a seat on the state supreme court vacated by the death of Justice William R. Harris. In August, 1858, he was elected to a full term. One account contrasted his practice as a judge, and as lawyer afterward:

Wright did not serve out his elected supreme court term due to the American Civil War. Wright "ardently espoused the cause of the Confederacy". His only two sons enlisted in the Confederate Army, and Wright, too old for active service himself, followed the army so as to remain close to his sons. One of them died in the Battle of Murfreesboro, but the other survived the war.

At the end of the war he found himself largely in debt because of obligations incurred in extensive purchases of plantations and slaves in Louisiana before the war. His property was dissipated by the war, but the debts remained. He declined to take advantage of a Louisiana law excusing payment of obligations incurred in the purchase of slaves, or of bankruptcy law. After briefly serving on a commission established to enforce a state lien on railways, he "labored incessantly at his profession until within a few weeks of his death", at the age of seventy-four. It was said that "he loosened the hold on life, as a giant oak in green old age rushes to its fall".

References

U.S. state supreme court judges admitted to the practice of law by reading law
United States Army personnel of the Seminole Wars
Members of the Tennessee House of Representatives
Justices of the Tennessee Supreme Court
1809 births
1884 deaths
People from Maury County, Tennessee
19th-century American politicians
19th-century American judges